Zvërnec Island is an island within the Narta Lagoon in southern Albania.

The island is nearly all covered with tall pine trees and is just east of a much smaller island. It is 430m in length and has a maximum width of 300m. Zvërnec Island is connected to the mainland by a 270m long wooden bridge.

The island is a tourist attraction because it contains the well preserved 13th-14th century Byzantine Zvërnec Monastery. Near the island lies the village that bears the same name.
The island has an area about 9 hectares.

Zvërnec Monastery

See also
Tourism in Albania
Albanian Riviera
Geography of Albania

References

Tourism in Albania
Islands of Albania
Geography of Vlorë County
Tourist attractions in Vlorë County